The Dezzo is a river of Lombardy and is the main river of Val di Scalve. Dezzo's mouth is close to the village of Boario Terme.

References 

Rivers of Italy
Rivers of Lombardy
Rivers of the Province of Bergamo
Rivers of the Province of Brescia